Deadland Ritual was a British–American hard rock supergroup band originally formed in Los Angeles in 2018, the band is a supergroup composed of vocalist Franky Perez (Apocalyptica), guitarist Steve Stevens (Billy Idol, Michael Jackson), bassist Geezer Butler (Black Sabbath, Heaven and Hell) and drummer Matt Sorum (the Cult, Guns N' Roses, Velvet Revolver and many others). Originally formed by Sorum, the group took shape with the addition of Perez and Stevens, and was finalised once Butler agreed to complete the lineup. Deadland Ritual released its first single, "Down in Flames", in December 2018.

History

2018–2019: formation, debut recordings and performances
The formation of Deadland Ritual was first announced on December 3, 2018, when the band's members began posting teasers of new music on their social media pages. Drummer Matt Sorum (formerly of Guns N' Roses, Velvet Revolver and more) initially conceived the band by enlisting vocalist Franky Perez (of Apocalyptica and formerly Scars on Broadway) and guitarist Steve Stevens (of Billy Idol), with former Black Sabbath bassist Geezer Butler brought in later. The drummer also came up with the name of the band, which is said to "reflect the idea of a ritualistic dead space". The band released its debut single and music video, "Down in Flames", a week later. The track was produced by Greg Fidelman. Revolver magazine's Kelsey Chapstick categorised the song as "heavy, bluesy rock", outlining that it "carries the sinister, devilish tones trademarked by Butler, but the exultant vocal performance by Perez and groove-laden syncopations of Sorum lend a distinctly contemporary hard-rock feel". Ryan Reed for Rolling Stone described the track as "a brooding blues-rock epic". Deadland Ritual played their first live shows in 2019, appearing at Download Festival in the UK and Hellfest in France, both in June. However, the band's debut was performed at The Troubadour in West Hollywood, California on May 28, 2019.

Future 
Speaking in an interview from March 2021, Geezer Butler said that Matt Sorum had left the project, and that he considers Deadland Ritual dead.

Band members

Final lineup
Franky Perez – lead vocals (2018–2019)
Steve Stevens – lead guitar (2018–2019)
Geezer Butler – bass guitar (2018–2019)
Matt Sorum – drums, percussion (2018–2019)

Discography
Singles
"Down in Flames" (2018)
"Broken and Bruised" (2019)

References

External links

American hard rock musical groups
English hard rock musical groups
Musical groups from Los Angeles
Musical groups established in 2018
Musical groups disestablished in 2021
Musical quartets
Rock music supergroups
2018 establishments in California
2021 disestablishments in California